Ricardo Klenk (born 29 September 1961) is an Argentine alpine skier. He competed in the men's slalom at the 1980 Winter Olympics.

References

1961 births
Living people
Argentine male alpine skiers
Olympic alpine skiers of Argentina
Alpine skiers at the 1980 Winter Olympics
Place of birth missing (living people)